Balance (translit. Ravnovesie) is a 1983 Bulgarian drama film directed by Lyudmil Kirkov. It was entered into the 13th Moscow International Film Festival where it won the Silver Prize.

Cast
 Georgi Georgiev-Getz as the screenwriter
 Plamena Getova as Elena
 Konstantin Kotsev as the film director
 Katerina Evro as Maria
 Pavel Popandov as Milko
 Vania Tzvetkova as the actress Vania
 Stefan Danailov as the actor
 Nevena Simeonova as Elena's mother
 Luchezar Stoyanov as the cameraman
 Ivan Dzhambazov as the chief of the production
 Maria Stefanova as the screenwriter's wife
 Stefan Ilyev as the friend of the Maria's father

References

External links
 

1983 films
1983 drama films
Bulgarian drama films
1980s Bulgarian-language films